The Dhuaian dam is a dam in Saudi Arabia opened in 2000 and located in Al Baha region.

See also 

 List of dams in Saudi Arabia

References 

Dams in Saudi Arabia